Moraea filicaulis is a flowering plant in the iris family, Iridaceae. It is endemic to South Africa where it occurs in Namaqualand, Knersvlakte, Olifants River Valley, and the West Coast. Moraea filicaulis is considered a species of least concern as it is widespread and common. It has previously been considered a subspecies of Moraea fugax.

References

filicaulis